Neural retina-specific leucine zipper protein is a protein that in humans is encoded by the NRL gene.

Function 

This gene encodes a basic motif-leucine zipper transcription factor of the Maf subfamily. The encoded protein is conserved among vertebrates and is a critical intrinsic regulator of photoreceptor cell development and function. Mutations in this gene have been associated with retinitis pigmentosa and degenerative diseases of the retina.

See also 
 Transcription factor

References

Further reading

External links 
  GeneReviews/NCBI/NIH/UW entry on Retinitis Pigmentosa Overview
 

Transcription factors